National Highway 71 (NH 71) was a National Highway in Northern India. National Highway 71 started at the junction of old NH 1 at Jalandhar and traverses down to Rewari to meet old NH 8.

New numbering 
Due to Rationalization of Numbering Systems of National Highways by  Ministry of Road Transport and Highways, old NH 71 has been renumbered as follows.

 Jalandhar - Moga - Barnala section is part of new National Highway 703
 Barnala - Sangrur  section is part of new National Highway 7
 Sangrur - Narwana  section is part of new National Highway 52
 Narwana - Rohtak - Rewari  section is part of new National Highway 352

Route
The route of National Highway 71 passed through the following towns.

Punjab
Jalandhar, Nakodar, Moga, Barnala, Sangrur, Patran, Khanauri

Haryana
Narwana Uchana, Jind,Dighal, julana]Rohtak, Dighal, Jhajjar, Rewari

Rewari bypass
The current alignment of NH 71 passes through Rewari city. The existing Rewari-Bawal road has only two lanes and passes through congested areas within the city. Therefore, vehicles take four-lane Rewari bypass before entering Rewari city and then take Bawal road. However even the Rewari bypass is within municipal limits.

New Rewari bypass (open to traffic)
Now an even better alignment of NH 71 completely bypassing Rewari is being constructed. The construction of an entirely new stretch of four-lane road started in May 2011. It takes off from the existing NH 71 at Bikaner-Lisana village a few kilometres before Rewari while coming from Jhajjar, crosses NH 71B (Rewari-Delhi road) over a bridge (that is now under construction) between the JLN canal and the police lines without touching NH 71B and join NH 8 (Delhi–Jaipur–Udaipur-Ahmedabad-Mumbai highway) at village Sangwadi at 81 km stone on NH 8 instead of Bawal. The new alignment of NH 71 from Rohtak would, thus, be Jhajjar–Rewari–Sangwadi instead of Jhajjar–Rewari–Bawal. The new stretch is scheduled to open for traffic from November 2013. The new alignment of NH71 does not enter Rewari town. It will have a flyover on Rewari-Delhi road between the JLN canal and the police lines.

Upgrade
The construction of four-lane 82.5 km long stretch from Rohtak to Rewari is being done under Design, Build, Finance, Operate, Transfer (DBFOT) basis by a concessionaire who will charge toll tax.

See also
 List of National Highways in India (by Highway Number)
 List of National Highways in India
 National Highways Development Project

References

External links
Driving Directions, Route map of National Highway 71
NH network map of India

71
71
National highways in India (old numbering)